The Tetzlaff Quartet is a German string quartet ensemble formed in 1994. The quartet has released four CD recordings, of which their 2014 recording of Berg's Lyric Suite and the Mendelssohn Quartet Op. 13 received a Diapason d'Or award and was an Editor's Choice for Gramaphone magazine.

Members
The current members of the quartet are:

 Christian Tetzlaff - first violin
 Elisabeth Kufferath - second violin
 Hanna Weinmeister - viola
 Tanja Tetzlaff - cello

Discography 
 Sibelius & Schoenberg: String Quartets (2010).  Avi-music AVI8553202
 Mendelssohn Quartet Op. 13 - Berg Lyric Suite (2014). Avi-music AVI8553266
 Schubert-Haydn: String Quartets (2017).  Ondine ODE 1293-2
 Beethoven:  String Quartets Opp. 132 & 130/133 (2020).  Ondine ODE 1347-2D

References

External links

German string quartets
Musical groups established in 1994
1994 establishments in Germany